Katie Meier  (born December 19, 1967) is head coach of the women's basketball team at the University of Miami in Coral Gables, Florida. She is a 1990 graduate of Duke University, where she played college basketball.

As of 2022, Meier has the most wins of any coach of the University of Miami women's basketball team in the program's 50-year history.

Playing career
Meier's success as a coach is a direct reflection on her playing career as a stand-out at Duke University. A four-year letter winner for the Blue Devils under head coach Debbie Leonard from 1986–90, Meier's name is scattered throughout the Duke record books. In 1990, Meier was named to the team representing the United States at the William Jones Cup competition in Taipei, Taiwan. The USA team was primarily made up of players from North Carolina State, while Meier was one of three players from other schools. The  team had a record of 3–4 in the competition. Meier averaged 5.9 points per game.

She currently ranks third all-time in scoring average (16.2 points per game), steals (232), free throws made (447) and free throws attempted (624). She also ranks fourth all-time in points (1,761), and fifth all-time in field goals made (653), field goals attempted (1,283) and assists (409) and ninth all-time at Duke in rebounding average (6.1 rebounds per game).

At Duke, in 1986, she earned ACC Rookie of the Year and Basketball Yearbook Freshman All-America honors. Meier injured her knee during her in 1988 during her junior season and ultimately missed the entire 1989 campaign while recovering.

Following graduation, Meier headed overseas to play professional basketball, spending three seasons with BBC Mini-Flat team in Waregam, Belgium from 1990 until 1993.

Duke Statistics
Source

Coaching career

Miami (FL)
Meier is in her sixteenth season as the head women's basketball coach for the Miami Hurricanes. She led her 2010–2011 team to a 26–3 (12–2) record and claimed a share of the ACC regular season title. She was named ACC Coach of the Year for the 2010–2011 campaign, as well as the AP College Basketball Coach of the Year. In her 15 seasons leading the Canes, Meier has amassed nine 20-win seasons and coached the team to 11 postseason appearances, including 10 straight from 2009–2019.
On November 9, 2021, she became the all time winningest coach in Miami basketball history.

Charlotte
During her four-year tenure at Charlotte, Meier led the 49ers to three postseason berths - one NCAA Tournament appearance (2003) and two WNIT appearances (2004, 2005) - and a combined overall record of 76–45 (.628). Prior to her appointment as head coach at Charlotte in 2001, the 49ers had only one previous postseason appearance - a WNIT berth in 1990. Meier was named both the WBCA Region IV Division I Coach of the Year and the Conference USA Coach of the Year in 2003.

In her inaugural campaign at Charlotte, Meier led the 49ers to a 16–13 finish to record their first winning season in eight years. The following season, she guided the 49ers to a 21–9 finish marking the most wins (21) in over a decade at Charlotte. With a 12–2 record in Conference USA play, Meier and the 49ers also earned the school's first-ever C-USA regular-season championship and earned the school's first-ever appearance at the NCAA Tournament.Meier was named both the WBCA Region IV Division I Coach of the Year and the Conference USA Coach of the Year in 2003.

Meier was named both the WBCA Region IV Division I Coach of the Year and the Conference USA Coach of the Year in 2003.

Tulane University
Prior to Charlotte, Meier spent seven seasons at Tulane University, serving as an associate head coach from 1999–01 and an assistant coach on the Green Wave staff from 1994–99. As a member of the Tulane coaching staff, Meier helped the Green Wave to an overall record of 164–52 (.759) in seven seasons, including the highest ranking in school history (13th by the Associated Press) in 2000 and a school-record 27 wins the same season.

During her time at Tulane, Meier and the Green Wave also saw an impressive seven-year run at the NCAA Tournament.

UNC Asheville
Meier began her collegiate coaching career at the University of North Carolina at Asheville where she served as an assistant coach during the 1993–94 season.

USA basketball

Meier served as the head coach of the USA Women's USA U18 team, representing the US in the FIBA Americas Championship in Gurabo, Puerto Rico where the team won all five games, resulting in the gold medal for the competition. She then continued as the head coach of the USA U19 team, which represented the US in the FIBA U19 World Championship held in Panevezys and Klaipeda, Lithuania in 2013. The helped guide the team to a 9–0 record, which resulted in the gold medal for the competition. She was named (along with Billy Donovan), co-recipient of the 2013 USA Basketball National Coach of the Year award.

Head Coaching Record

Awards and honors
 2003 WBCA Region IV Division I Coach of the Year
 2003 Conference USA Coach of the Year
 2011 Russell Athletic/WBCA Region 2 Division I Coach of the Year
 2011 AP College Basketball Coach of the Year
 2013 USA Basketball National Coach of the Year award

References

External

 Video highlights of the co-recipients of the 2013 USA Basketball National Coach of the Year award

1967 births
Living people
American women's basketball coaches
Basketball coaches from Illinois
Basketball players from Illinois
Charlotte 49ers women's basketball coaches
Duke Blue Devils women's basketball players
Miami Hurricanes women's basketball coaches
Sportspeople from Wheaton, Illinois
Tulane Green Wave women's basketball coaches
UNC Asheville Bulldogs women's basketball coaches